The Swiss Federal Laboratories for Materials Science and Technology (Empa, German acronym for Eidgenössische Materialprüfungs- und Forschungsanstalt) is an interdisciplinary Swiss research institute for applied materials sciences and technology. As part of the Swiss Federal Institutes of Technology Domain, it is an institution of the Swiss federation. For most of the period since its foundation in 1880, it concentrated on classical materials testing. Since the late 1980s it has developed into a modern research and development  institute.

Research
According to its vision – Materials and technologies for a sustainable future – Empa aims at developing solutions for current problems facing industry and society in areas such as energy, the environment, mobility, health and safety. Research is concentrated in five Research Focus Areas: "Nanostructured Materials," "Sustainable Built Environment," "Health and Performance," "Natural Resources and Pollutants," and "Energy".

Empa's annual budget in 2015 amounted to 107 million Swiss francs of Federal funding and 61 million Swiss francs of third party means, of which 45 million Swiss francs came from research grants and 11 million Swiss francs from services.

The strategy shift from a materials testing to a research institute has been increasingly apparent since 2001: the number of scientific publications increased from 67 in 2001 to close to 630 in 2015. The number of projects financed by the Swiss National Science Foundation (SNSF) increased from 5 in 2001 to 120 in the same period. External funding has also grown from 33.8 million Swiss francs in 2000 to around 61 million Swiss francs (2015). Empa is currently involved in more than 60 projects funded under the EU framework programs.

Applied research and development in the institute often unfold in close collaboration with partners from industry. This is also reflected by the Empa slogan: "Empa - The Place where Innovation starts". Empa embraces a multidisciplinary approach – scientists and engineers from a wide range of disciplines work side by side on most projects.

The Empa also provides support to both of the Swiss Federal Institutes of Technology in Zurich and Lausanne, supports teaching in universities and universities of applied sciences (UAS) and is active in organizing scientific conferences and advanced training courses through the Empa-Akademie. Conferences, lecture series, seminars and courses are aimed at scientists, professionals from industry and the private-sector, and also the general public, for example, through the "Science Aperitifs" events.

History 

In 1880, Empa's forerunner, the "Institution for the Testing of Building Materials" begins its work  at the Polytechnic Institute in Zurich. Its first Director is Ludwig von Tetmajer, professor for building materials. In 1891 Tetmajer is charged with investigating the Münchenstein rail disaster, the collapse of a railway bridge, built by the world-famous engineer Gustave Eiffel. Tetmajer is quickly able to demonstrate that the use of Euler's hyperbola, which up to that time had been the standard technique, is only applicable in the elastic region of the steel used for the bridge.

In 1895, the name ″Federal Materials Testing Institute" is first used, the German acronym for which is Empa.

In 1937, the Swiss Testing Institution, St. Gallen, having been expanded in 1911 to a textile testing authority, merges with EMPA. The expanded organization is renamed "Federal Materials Testing and Experimental Institute for Industry, Civil Engineering and Trade".

In 1962, the Empa moves from Zurich to Dübendorf. The key areas at this site are civil engineering, safety technology, surface technology, metallic materials, composites, non-destructive testing, chemical analysis, exhaust gas and atmospheric measurements, building technologies, building physics, acoustics and noise abatement.

In 1988, a significant change of course occurs, with a strong emphasis on research and development. The Empa is renamed "Swiss Federal Laboratories for Materials Testing and Research" (Eidgenössische Materialprüfungs- und Versuchsanstalt in German).

In 1996, staff at Empa's St.Gallen site move into their new building “Im Moos”. Core activities are clothing physiology, personal protective systems, functional fibers and textiles, biocompatible materials, materials and image modeling, and technology risk evaluation.

In 2001, Empa's priorities are oriented firmly towards research and innovative developments. An international Research Commission is established, evaluating Empa's R&D activities on a regular basis.

In 2003 nanotechnology is established at Empa. The new laboratory "nanotech@surfaces" works on nanostructures, nanotubes as electron emitters and quasi-crystalline layers. In Dübendorf another new lab, "Functional Polymers", is established.

In 2004 yet another nano lab sees the light of day at the Dübendorf site: "Nanoscale Materials Science", focusing on developing and analyzing nanostructured surfaces and coatings.

In 2005, together with the Warsaw University of Technology and the AGH University of Science and Technology in Kraków, Empa founds the International PhD School Switzerland – Poland. ETH Zurich, Jagiellonian University in Kraków and Warsaw University have since joined. Meanwhile, this cooperation with the EU's new member states (NMS) has expanded substantially within the framework of The Swiss contribution to EU enlargement, for instance via numerous "Joint Research Projects" as well as joint events such as the "Swiss-Polish Science & Technology Days", which were staged for the first time in Warsaw in 2010.

Further laboratories are founded: "Mechanics of Materials and Nanostructures", "Mechanical Systems Engineering", "Mechanics for Modeling and Simulation", "Biomaterials", "Materials-Biology Interactions", "Hydrogen & Energy" and "Solid State Chemistry and Catalysis". In 2006 the "Center for Synergetic Structures", a public-private partnership (PPP) between Empa and Festo, is established with the goal to develop novel, ultra-lightweight load-bearing structures.

In 2008, Empa opens a new business incubator, "glaTec", in Dübendorf to support the founding of innovative start-ups and spin-offs in close proximity to Empa. glaTec is the counterpart to "tebo" in St. Gallen, which has been in operation since 1996. Empa also intensifies its activities in photovoltaics. Moreover, a closer cooperation with Japan's "National Institute for Materials Science" (NIMS) is agreed upon, resulting in the 2010 opening of a NIMS office at Empa.

In 2010, Empa expands its business development endeavors and develops new models of cooperating with industry, tailored specifically to the partner's needs. Among other things, strategic alliances are forged in vital areas such as fuel cells, innovative medtech applications and sustainable mobility. In the same year, the Empa is streamlining its R&D portfolio into five "Research Focus Areas", which are geared even more stringently towards Empa's core competence: turning research and technologies into marketable innovations.

With 25 projects in 2011 and 2012, Empa plays an extremely successful role in the special measures against the strong franc funded by the Commission for Technology and Innovation (CTI), which are designed to boost the innovative strength and thus the competitive ability of Swiss companies.

In 2014, the Swiss government initiates a focus program to encourage energy research: Eight different Swiss Competence Centers for Energy Research (SCCERs) are designed to connect Swiss universities and research institutions more effectively in the field of energy research and promote synergies. As leading house, Empa is in charge of one of these eight centers – Future Energy-Efficient Buildings & Districts (FEEB&D) – with the aim of reducing the energy consumption of Switzerland's building stock fivefold by the year 2050.

2014 marks the ground-breaking ceremony of NEST, an innovative building concept that should help launch technology and products in the building and energy sector on the market sooner in conjunction with industrial partners. NEST comprises a central “backbone” and three open platforms, where individual research and innovation modules can be installed based on a “plug-and-play” principle.

In 2015 NEST's backbone is up. The construction of the first modules gets underway.
The same year, Empa opens a second demonstration and technology transfer platform in the mobility sector: “move”, which enables new vehicle drive concepts with considerably lower  emissions to be developed and tested in practice. These include hydrogen vehicles, various hybrid concepts or optimized gas vehicles. The energy source is currently electricity from photovoltaic plants or hydroelectric power stations that temporarily fluctuates heavily and is not needed on the power grid. It is initially converted into hydrogen or methane by electrolyzing water (power-to-gas concept). 
At the same time, a third platform commences operations: ehub (Energy Hub), which acts as a kind of nerve center to control and coordinate energy flows between NEST and “move” with their various energy users and sources. ehub should therefore guarantee an optimized energy supply, especially using heavily fluctuating energy sources such as solar and wind power. The platform therefore has diverse temporary storage facilities for the various energy sources.

Notes and references

Associated institutions 

 Swiss National Supercomputing Centre

See also 
 Science and technology in Switzerland
 NaOH Summer winter heat storage

External links 
 
 Empa Academy

ETH Domain
Laboratories in Switzerland
Education in Zürich
Research institutes in Zürich